Lek or LEK may refer to:
 Lek mating, mating in a lek, a type of animal territory in which males of a species gather
 Albanian lek, the currency of Albania
 Lek (magazine), a Norwegian softcore pornographic magazine 
 Lek (pharmaceutical company), now part of Sandoz, the generic drug subsidiary of Novartis
 Lek (river), a river in the west of the Netherlands
 De Lek, a former manorial fiefdom in the Netherlands
 L.E.K. Consulting, international strategy consulting firm
 Leung King stop, Hong Kong (by MTR station code)
 Tata Airport, Guinea (by IATA code)
 Lek, a fictional form of Cardassian currency in Star Trek
 Lek, เล็ก, a Thai name or nickname, meaning little
 especially the personal nickname - in private family - of late King Bhumibol Adulyadej of Thailand
 Lek Nana, 1924 – 2010, a Thai businessman and politician
 Lek Viriyaphant, or Khun Lek, 1914 - 2000, a Thai millionaire and art patronage mecenate

See also
 Lec (disambiguation)
 Leck (disambiguation)
 Lək (disambiguation), places in Azerbaijan